Twajeel is a village in Mauritania near the disputed Western Sahara territory.  There is a school called the Mudarsahtu-Twajeel which set to open in 2023.  There is also an airport called the Twajeel Airport, which books flights to Fderîck and Zouerat.  A train station is also located in the town called Mateo Twajeel.

References 

Populated places in Mauritania